Ambani Shankar is an Indian actor who has appeared in Tamil films. He has appeared in films including Ji (2005) and Ambasamudram Ambani (2010), and garnered his stage name from the latter film.

Career
Shankar grew up in Tirumangalam, Madurai and was inspired by the success of actor Vadivelu, which prompted him to move to Chennai to pursue acting in 2004. Unable to get a breakthrough in films, he began working as a clerk at K. Bhagyaraj's office and was first spotted by N. Linguswamy to feature as a road-side cycle mechanic in Ji (2005). He continued to feature in small comedic roles in films including Indiralohathil Na Azhagappan (2008) and Kuselan (2008).

Shankar made a breakthrough with his performance in Ambasamudram Ambani (2010), portraying a negative role alongside Karunas. Rediff.com praised his portrayal and stated "Shankar, has delivered an outstanding performance" and that "he laughs, cries, delivers and receives blows and bouquets with perfect style, transforming himself into the role very convincingly". Likewise, Sify.com labelled him as a "good performer", while Behindwoods.com noted that he "steals the show". He subsequently added "Ambani" as a prefix to his stage name.

In 2017, he featured in the Tamil Nadu State Para Badminton tournament and won a gold medal.

Filmography

References

External links
Ambani Shankar on Facebook

Living people
Male actors in Tamil cinema
21st-century Indian male actors
Tamil comedians
Male actors from Madurai
1988 births